Lady Slipper was a municipality that held community status in Prince Edward Island, Canada. On September 28, 2018, it was combined with the municipality of Ellerslie-Bideford, to create the new municipality of Central Prince.

References 

Communities in Prince County, Prince Edward Island
Former rural municipalities in Prince Edward Island
Populated places disestablished in 2018